Meghan Addy (born 22 May 1978) is an American athlete who mainly competes in the 400 metres.

At the World Indoor Championships in Athletics 2004, Addy was part of the US team which finished third in the 4 x 400 metres relay.

Personal bests

Outdoor
 400 metres: 53.70 seconds (2002)
 400 metres hurdles: 55.70 seconds (2004)

Indoor
 400 metres: 53.88 seconds (2003)

References

1978 births
Living people
American female sprinters
Place of birth missing (living people)
World Athletics Indoor Championships medalists